is a passenger railway station in located in the city of Yokkaichi, Mie Prefecture, Japan, operated by Central Japan Railway Company (JR Tōkai). It is also a freight depot for the freight-only Sangi Railway.

Lines
Tomida Station is served by the Kansai Main Line, and is 31.7 rail kilometers from the terminus of the line at Nagoya Station.

Station layout
The station consists of one side platform and one island platform serving three tracks, connected by a footbridge. Another island platform exists for tracks 4 and 5, but is not in use, and is currently serving as a siding for freight cars. The station is unattended.

Platforms

Adjacent stations

|-
!colspan=5|Central Japan Railway Company (JR Central)

|-
!colspan=5|Sangi Railway

Station history
Tomida Station was opened on July 5, 1894, as a station on the Kansai Railway. The Kansai Railway was nationalized on October 1, 1907, becoming part of the Japanese Government Railways (JGR) and the Sangi Railway Line connected to this station on July 23, 1931. The JGR became the Japan National Railways (JNR) after World War II. Freight car operations on the JNR were discontinued November 15, 1982. The station was absorbed into the JR Central network upon the privatization of the JNR on April 1, 1987.

Station numbering was introduced to the section of the Kansai Main Line operated JR Central in March 2018; Tomida Station was assigned station number CI09.

Passenger statistics
In fiscal 2019, the station was used by an average of 795 passengers daily (boarding passengers only).

Surrounding area
Tomida Ichirizuka
Yokkaichi City Tomida Elementary School
Sangi Railway Headquarters

See also
 List of railway stations in Japan

References

External links

Railway stations in Japan opened in 1894
Railway stations in Mie Prefecture
Yokkaichi